The Third Ichirō Hatoyama Cabinet is the 54th Cabinet of Japan headed by Ichirō Hatoyama from November 22, 1955, to December 23, 1956.

Cabinet

References 

Cabinet of Japan
1955 establishments in Japan
Cabinets established in 1955
Cabinets disestablished in 1956